Rodrigo Raúl Lastra (born 24 June 1998) is an Argentine professional footballer who plays as a midfielder for Comunicaciones.

Career
Lastra's career began with Central Córdoba, a club he made his senior bow for in October 2014 during a Copa Argentina loss to city rivals Mitre. From 2016, Lastra played for Primera División outfit Defensa y Justicia's reserves. On 30 June 2018, Lastra departed to join Comunicaciones of Primera B Metropolitana. He didn't feature in the first part of 2018–19, with his professional league bow eventually arriving in a victory on the road against UAI Urquiza in February 2019.

Career statistics
.

References

External links

1998 births
Living people
People from Santiago del Estero
Argentine footballers
Association football midfielders
Primera B Metropolitana players
Central Córdoba de Santiago del Estero footballers
Defensa y Justicia footballers
Club Comunicaciones footballers
Sportspeople from Santiago del Estero Province